The United Nations Educational, Scientific and Cultural Organization (UNESCO) World Heritage Sites are places of importance to cultural or natural heritage as described in the UNESCO World Heritage Convention, established in 1972. Cultural heritage consists of monuments (such as architectural works, monumental sculptures, or inscriptions), groups of buildings, and sites (including archaeological sites). Natural features (consisting of physical and biological formations), geological and physiographical formations (including habitats of threatened species of animals and plants), and natural sites which are important from the point of view of science, conservation or natural beauty, are defined as natural heritage. Bosnia and Herzegovina inherited the former country of Yugoslavia's accession to the convention on 12 July 1993 as one of the successor states.

, there are four sites in Bosnia and Herzegovina on the list and a further 10 on the tentative list. The first site, the Old Bridge Area of the Old City of Mostar, was inscribed to the list at the 29th UNESCO session in 2005. The Mehmed Paša Sokolović Bridge in Višegrad was inscribed to the list in 2007. This was followed by the inscription of the Stećci Medieval Tombstones Graveyards in 2016. The latter is a transnational site, shared with Croatia, Serbia, and Montenegro. Out of 28 listed Stećci sites, 20 are located in Bosnia and Herzegovina, with the most prominent one in Radimlja. The most recent site added to the list was the Janj forest, in 2021, as an extension to the site Ancient and Primeval Beech Forests of the Carpathians and Other Regions of Europe, which is shared among 18 European countries. The Janj forest is a natural site, while the other three sites are cultural sites.

World Heritage Sites 
UNESCO lists sites under ten criteria; each entry must meet at least one of the criteria. Criteria i through vi are cultural, and vii through x are natural.

Tentative list 
In addition to the sites inscribed on the World Heritage List, member states can maintain a list of tentative sites that they may consider for nomination. Nominations for the World Heritage List are only accepted if the site was previously listed on the tentative list. , Bosnia and Herzegovina recorded ten sites on its tentative list.

See also 
 List of National Monuments of Bosnia and Herzegovina
 List of protected areas of Bosnia and Herzegovina

References 

 

W
W
W
Bosnia and Herzegovina
 
World Heritage Sites